Army Major General Robert L. Nabors is senior Vice President for EDS U.S. Government Solutions, with special responsibility for Homeland Security. He is the father of Rob Nabors, who has served as White House Deputy Chief of Staff and Director of the Office of Legislative Affairs during the Obama Administration.

Background
Robert L. Nabors is a Western New York native who grew up in Lackawanna and is a graduate of Lackawanna's class of 1964. Although he traces his roots to the American South, he is the youngest son of Mansfield and Mabel Nabors of Buckingham County, Virginia. Nabors was a highly decorated African American U.S. Army officer who has received nearly 400 awards and honors and 38 official military awards and decorations. Major General Nabors received the Distinguished Service Medal, the military's third-highest award; Defense Superior Service Medal; Legion of Merit with four oak leaf clusters; Bronze Star Medal; and the Presidential Support Badge. Nabors honorary awards include  NAACP Roy Wilkins Award of Renown 2000. He received a Bachelor of Science in Systems Engineering from the University of Arizona and is a graduate of the Senior Officials in National Security Program at Harvard University. Nabors also is a member of the American Mensa Society.

References

.

1940s births
Living people
University of Arizona alumni
Harvard Fellows
Mensans
United States Army generals